Albiano is a comune in the autonomous province of Trentino in north Italy.

Sport
The local amateur football club, A.S.D. Porfido Albiano, currently plays in the Eccellenza Trentino-Alto Adige/Südtirol.

References

External links
 Homepage of the city

Cities and towns in Trentino-Alto Adige/Südtirol